Cole A. Kimball (born August 1) is an American former professional baseball pitcher.

Career
Born in Brooklyn, Kimball moved to the Great Meadows section of Independence Township, New Jersey as a child. A graduate of Hackettstown High School, Kimball first attended St. John's University in New York, before transferring to Centenary College of New Jersey and was selected by the Nationals in the 12th round of the 2006 amateur draft.

After being drafted by Washington, Kimball began his minor-league career pitching for the Vermont Lake Monsters in the short-season New York–Penn League.  In five starts and eleven relief appearances, he pitched 34 innings, compiling a win–loss record of 1–4 and an ERA of 5.82.

Kimball remained with the Lake Monsters in 2007. He accrued a record of 3 wins and 6 losses and a 4.20 ERA over 61 innings, consisting of 13 starts and one appearance in relief.  After an unimpressive 2008 season with the low A Hagerstown Suns, where he compiled a 6-8 record and a 5.05 ERA he was promoted to the Potomac Nationals (high A) and converted to a reliever.  His woes worsened, and although he saved 9 games, his ERA was 6.36.

In 2010, however, Kimball seemed to turn the corner. Starting the season at Potomac, he was 3-0 with six saves and an ERA of 1.82 before he was promoted. At AA Harrisburg, he continued to pitch well, earning 12 more saves to go with a 5-1 record and ERA of 2.33.

Kimball started the 2011 season at AAA Syracuse. After 12 appearances, in which he threw 13 2/3 innings, without allowing a run, he was called up to the majors.  He made his debut on May 14, pitching one scoreless inning. He made 12 appearances for the Nationals before suffering a torn rotator cuff in July 2011. He had surgery, and missed the remainder of the 2011 season.

Kimball was claimed off waivers by the Toronto Blue Jays on November 16, 2011. However, the Nationals claimed him back on November 18. He missed the 2012 season as he recovered from his injury. The Nationals removed him from their 40-man roster in July 2013.

Kimball signed a minor league deal with the New York Yankees in February 2014.

He now pitches in the Blue Mountain League, a premier amateur wood bat league in PA's Lehigh Valley. Kimball plays for the Martin's Creek Creekers.

References

External links

1985 births
Living people
American expatriate baseball players in Mexico
Baseball players from New York (state)
Camden Riversharks players
Centenary Cyclones baseball players
Gulf Coast Nationals players
Hackettstown High School alumni

Hagerstown Suns players
Harrisburg Senators players
Major League Baseball pitchers
Mexican League baseball pitchers
People from Hackettstown, New Jersey
People from Independence Township, New Jersey
Potomac Nationals players
Salt River Rafters players
Saraperos de Saltillo players
Scottsdale Scorpions players
Sportspeople from Brooklyn
Baseball players from New York City
Sportspeople from Warren County, New Jersey
St. John's Red Storm baseball players
Syracuse Chiefs players
Tiburones de La Guaira players
American expatriate baseball players in Venezuela
Vermont Lake Monsters players
Washington Nationals players
Centenary University alumni